Ray Bloom (born George Raymond Bloom; 13 September 1941, in Aston, Sheffield, Yorkshire, England) was an English first-class cricketer, who played one match for Yorkshire in 1964.  A left-handed batsman, he made his solitary appearance against Kent at Dover, scoring two runs before being bowled by Derek Underwood in his only innings, and taking two catches.

He was also associated with the Scarborough club. He played for Yorkshire Second XI in the Minor Counties championship from 1962 to 1964.

References

External links
 Cricinfo Profile

1941 births
Yorkshire cricketers
Cricketers from Sheffield
Cricketers from Scarborough, North Yorkshire
Living people
English cricketers
People educated at Scarborough High School for Boys